Werner Ploberger (born 5 August 1956 in Vienna) is an Austrian economist. He graduated in mathematics from the Vienna University of Technology. Beginning in 1997, he was a professor of economics at the University of Rochester. Effective July 1, 2006, he is professor of economics at Washington University in St. Louis. He is married to Gabriele Ploberger, and has a son.

Literature

Testing for Structural Change in Dynamic Models (with W. Krämer and R. Alt), Econometrica, Vol. 56, No.6, 1988, pp. 1355–1369.
A New Test for Structural Stability in the Linear Regression Model (with W. Kraemer and K. Kontrus), Journal of Econometrics, vol. 40, 1989, pp. 307–318.
The CUSUM-Test with OLS-Residuals (with W. Krämer), Econometrica, Vol. 60, No. 2, 1992, pp. 271–285.
Posterior Odds Testing for a Unit Root with Data-Based Model Selection (with Peter C. B. Phillips), Econometric Theory, Vol.10, No. 3-4, 1994, pp 771–808.
Optimal Tests When a Nuisance Parametere is Present Only Under the Alternative (with Donald Andrews), Econometrica, Vol. 62, No. 6, 1994, pp. 1383–1414
An Asymptotic Theory of Bayesian Inference for Time Series (with Peter C.B. Phillips), Econometrica Vol. 64, No.2, 1996, pp 381–412
Asymptotic Theory of Integrated Conditional Moments Tests (with Herman J. Bierens), Econometrica vol 65 no. 5, 1997, pp. 1129–1145
 Empirical Limits for Time Series Econometric Models (with Peter C. B. Phillips), Econometrica, Vol. 71(2), 2003, pp. 627–673

External links 
Homepage
Washington University in St. Louis

Living people
Washington University in St. Louis faculty
University of Rochester faculty
Writers from Vienna
TU Wien alumni
1956 births
Austrian emigrants to the United States